Tafsir Imam Ja'far al-Sadiq refers to a collection of hadiths reportedly narrated by Ja'far al-Sadiq (83-148 A.H) that comment on the verses of the Qur'an. The approach of these narratives is generally mystical. Initially, they were recited at Sufi circles in Kufa and Baghdad. The first person to have reported this collection is one of Sufi scholars Abu Abd al-Rahman Sulami (325-412 A.H) as part of his Haqaiq al-Tafsir . While Sulami provides parts of the hadiths, Sufi scholar Khargushi (died 666 A.H) provides some other in his Arais al-Bayan fi Haqaiq al-Quran Ruzbihan Baqli.

The Nafidh Pasha collection in Sulaymaniyya library contains another Quranic exegesis attributed to Ja'far al-Sadiq. The hadiths in this work are gathered by Ahmad ibn Muhammad ibn Harb. His transmission chain going back to Ja'far al-Sadiq includes Abu Tahir ibn Mumin, Abu Muhammad Hassan ibn Muhammad ibn Hamza, Muhammad ibn Hamza, Abu Muhammad Hassan ibn Abd Allah, Ali ibn Muhammad ibn Ali ibn Musa al-Riza, Imam Musa ibn Jafar. This is while that of Sulami is  Abu Bakr Ahmad ibn Nasr Baghdadi, Abd Allah Ahmad ibn Amir, and Ali al-Ridha.

Historical authenticity
In al-Dharia, there is reference to a treatise titled Tafsir Imam Jafar ibn Muhammad al-Sadiq, a manuscript of which is available with Ali pasha Library in Istanbul. Aqa Bozorg Tehrani asserts that Shia biographers and scholars of transmission authorities (rijal) do not refer to this treatises. He further surmises though that some companions of Ja'far al-Sadiq may have in fact narrated such hadiths from him. The exegesis indicated by Aqa Bozorg seems to be the same as the one compiled by Ahmad ibn Muhammad ibn Harb.

Tafsir Numani is also sometimes known as Tafsir Imam Jafar al-Sadiq. This book is collected by Abu Abd Allah Muhammad ibn Ibrahim Numani. Paul Nwyia believes this exegetic work is a Shia counterpart to Ibn Ata's exegesis on Quran except that in Sunni versions, the hadiths referring to the Ahl al-Bayt are all removed but one.

Massignon believes a number of people could have compiled this exegetic work. Among them he names Jabir ibn Hayyan al-Kufi (aka Geber). He argues that Geber produced a number of books using Ja'far al-Sadiq's name, as the author. He adds that Dhul-Nun al-Misri whom according to Massignon believes was the first to edit Ja'far al-Sadiq's exegesis, was Geber's student in alchemy. Massignon also points out that Geber wrote a number of books on asceticism in which he uses the pseudonym Sufi. This view is in line with Ibn Nadim's statement of a book titled al-Tafsir among Geber's work. However, Aqa Buzurg challenges Ibn Nadim's attribution on the basis of Ibn Nadim's other claim that there is no mention of Geber in Shii books on transmission authorities.

In Shia orthodoxy, the hadiths are not categorized as "narrated from the Prophet Muhammad and Imams" because rarely to the Ahadith come with transmission chains.

Structure
The exegesis opens with a hadith from Ja'far al-Sadiq, in which he classifies the verses of the Qur'an into four types: expressions (ibarat), allusions (isharat), substitutes (lataif), and truths (haqaiqa). Expressions are for common folk. The exegesis on each verse begins by citing a passage from the Qur'an. Then with the introduction of an expression like Jafar said, the exegesis comments. It contains approximately 35 hadiths covering 310 verses from various parts of the Qur'an.

See also
Qur'an
Qur'anic exegesis (Tafsir)
List of tafsir works

References

Shia tafsir